Skarbimierz  is a settlement in the administrative district of Gmina Połczyn-Zdrój, within Świdwin County, West Pomeranian Voivodeship, in north-western Poland.

See also 

 History of Pomerania

References

Skarbimierz